The following is a timeline of the history of the town of Aleksandrów Łódzki, Poland.

Prior to 19th century 

  6500 B.C. – Oldest traces of humans - settlement of ancient hunters on dunes near the Rąbień reserve.
 11th-12th century – First villages founded in the current area of Aleksandrów Łódzki commune: Rąbień, Bełdów, Brużyca Wielka, Prawęcice and Zgniłe Błoto.
 14th-15th century - More villages and Church of All Saints in Bełdów founded.
 1782 – First German settlers arrived in Brużyca Wielka, many colonies founded.
 1793 – Territory annexed by Prussia in the Second Partition of Poland.

19th century 

 1807 – Territory included within the Duchy of Warsaw.
 1815 – Territory included within so-called Congress Poland under Russian rule.
  1816 – Owner of Brużyca Wielka – Polish nobleman Rafał Bratoszewski of Sulima coat of arms founded a new town settlement on a sandy and forestry hill – this was the future Aleksandrów. A rectangular marketplace was made along with few streets. Squire Bratoszewski founded the catholic parish of St. Rafael and Michael.
 22 March 1822 – New settlement gained city rights and was named Aleksandrów in the name of then-ruling tzar of Russia and king of Poland – Alexander I of Russia. Aleksandrów had then 3,086 citizens, the majority of them were weavers.
 1824 - Neo-classical town hall built during the mayor Gedeon Goedel's term.
 6 December 1824 - Founder of Aleksandrów Rafał Bratoszewski died and was buried in the local church. Aleksandrów became the property of the Kossowski family of Dołęga coat of arms.
 1825 – The city as an example of perfect weaving center was visited by the tzar of Russia and king of Poland Alexander I of Russia.
 1828 - A huge evangelic church built, Fryderyk Jerzy Tuve became the first pastor.
 1830–1831 – Citizens along with Gedeon Goedel supported the November Uprising by sending uniforms, a squad and a doctor to Warsaw.
 25 October 1833 - Izrael Poznański was born in Aleksandrów.
 1858-1860 - A new road leading to Łódź via the new suburbs Bałuty built.
 1863-1864 - January Uprising – few citizens took part in fighting and the city was taken twice by the uprising soldiers.
 1866 - Chanoch Henich ha-Kohen Lewin settled in Aleksandrów. Since then the town has become a major Jewish religious centre.
 1869 - Aleksandrów lost its city rights.
 1888 - The first mechanical stocking factory built by Roman Paschke.

20th century 
 1903 - Voluntary Fire Brigade and "Lutnia" singer association formed.
 1905 - Strikes of workers and teachers against Russification.
 1910 - An electric tram line connected Aleksandrów with Łódź.
 11 November 1918 - A group of firefighters disarmed a German military outpost. The beginnings of independence of Poland.
 1924 - Aleksandrów regained city rights and it is now called Łódzki.
 1927 - A new school opened at Bankowa street.

 1939
 7 September: German troops entered the town at the start of World War II. Beginning of German occupation.
 14 September: 5 Poles and 26 Jews executed by German soldiers.
 9 November: Aleksandrów annexed to Nazi Germany. The synagogue along with monuments of Tadeusz Kościuszko and Józef Piłsudski destroyed, Polish and Jewish schools closed.
 27 December: Jews deported to General Government where most of them died in German concentration camps.
 1943 - Aleksandrów renamed to Wirkheim (home of the weavers).
 1945
 17 January: Aleksandrów liberated by Soviet tank squads.
 24 January: Józef Janiak became the first post-war mayor of Aleksandrów.
 16 February: The first high school opened - State Coeducational Gymnasium. Currently the Mikołaj Kopernik High School.
 1945-1947 - Germans forcibly moved to Germany in accordance with the Potsdam Agreement. For the first time in its history Aleksandrów became a solely Polish town.
 1951-1953 - Airport built.
 1959 - Primary school no. 4 opened.
 1970s and 1980s - Bratoszewskiego, Sikorskiego and Słoneczne estates built in eastern parts of the city.
 1974 - A youth community center opened.
 1979 - Friends of Aleksandrów Association founded.
 1983 - The first Days of Aleksandrów held.
 27 May 1990 - The first free elections to the city council won by Aleksandrowska Akcja Społeczna. Krzysztof Czajkowski became the mayor.
 8 December 1991 - A local newspaper "Czterdzieści i cztery" issues its first edition.
 1991-1995 - The tram connection to Łódź discontinued. Currently, the cities are connected by bus line no. 78.
 1998  Sokół Aleksandrów Łódzki football club founded.
 1999 - Aleksandrów Association of Entrepreneurs 2000 founded.
 27 October 2000 - Local elections won by the Platforma Obywatelska. Jacek Lipiński became the mayor.

21st century 
 2006 - Elections won again by the Platforma Obywatelska. Jacek Lipiński elected for his second term.

References

This article incorporates information from the Polish Wikipedia and German Wikipedia.

Aleksandrów Łódzki
Aleksandrów Łódzki
Years in Poland